Izatullah Safi (born 8 June 1978) is a cricket umpire from Afghanistan. He stood in his first One Day International (ODI) match between Afghanistan and Ireland on 7 December 2017. He stood in his first Twenty20 International (T20I) match between Afghanistan and Zimbabwe on 6 February 2018.

See also
 List of One Day International cricket umpires
 List of Twenty20 International cricket umpires

References

External links
 

1978 births
Living people
Afghan cricket umpires
Afghan One Day International cricket umpires
Afghan Twenty20 International cricket umpires
Place of birth missing (living people)